Rattlesnakes are a group of venomous snakes, genera Crotalus and Sistrurus.

Rattlesnake or Rattlesnakes may also refer to:

Films
 The Rattlesnake (film), a 1913 silent film short
 Rattlesnakes (film), a 2019 film
 Rattlesnake (1995 film), an action film
 Rattlesnake (2019 film), a crime drama mystery film

Music
 The Rattlesnakes (1955 band), the Bee Gees band
 Frank Carter & The Rattlesnakes, an English hardcore punk band 2015
Rattlesnake, album by A Static Lullaby
 Rattlesnakes (album), a 1984 album by British pop band Lloyd Cole and the Commotions
 "Rattlesnake" (song), a 1997 song by American rock band Live
"Rattlesnake", a song by King Gizzard and the Lizard Wizard from the 2017 album Flying Microtonal Banana 
 "Rattlesnake", a song by The Replacements from the 1981 album Sorry Ma, Forgot to Take Out the Trash
 "Rattlesnake", a song by St. Vincent from the 2014 album St. Vincent

Places
 Rattlesnake (Tampa), a neighborhood located in the South Tampa district of Tampa, Florida, United States
 Rattlesnake Creek (disambiguation)
 Rattlesnake Hills AVA, a wine region in Yakima County, Washington, United States
 Rattlesnake Island (disambiguation)
 Rattlesnake Knob, a summit in the U.S. state of Wisconsin

Ships
 HMS Rattlesnake, several ships of the Royal Navy
 MV Rattlesnake, a Canadian ferry
 USS Rattlesnake (1813), a United States Navy brig
 , an American steamer

Other
 The Rattlesnake (Remington), a 1905 equestrian sculpture by Frederic Remington
 Rattlesnake (roller coaster), a roller coaster ride which opened in 1998 at Chessington World of Adventures
 Rattlesnake bean
 Rattlesnake Annie (born 1941), American country singer and songwriter
 Rattlesnake Jake, a character in the 2011 animated film Rango
 Texas Rattlesnake, a nickname given to former wrestler Stone Cold Steve Austin
 A type of noise sometimes made by a wastegate
 The Rattlesnake (also known as The Carolinian), a 1922 play by Raphael Sabatini and J. E. Harold Terry